The discography of Elle Varner, an American singer-songwriter, consists of two studio albums, one mixtape, seven singles, two promotional singles and two music videos.

In January 2012, Elle Varner released her first project Conversational Lush. Varner's debut single "Only Wanna Give It to You" was released on August 6, 2011. The song, which serves as the lead single from her debut studio album Perfectly Imperfect, features American rapper J. Cole. The song peaked at No. 20 on the US Billboard R&B/Hip-Hop Songs chart. In October 2011, she was listed as one of TheBoomBox's '15 Artists to Watch' and was one of the artists featured in BET's Music Matters campaign. On October 7, 2011, RCA Music Group announced it was disbanding J Records along with Arista Records and Jive Records. With the shutdown, Varner (and all other artists previously signed to these three labels) released her debut album on RCA Records. The second single from Varner's debut album "Refill" was released to iTunes January 31, 2012, and debuted at No. 78 on the US Billboard R&B/Hip-Hop Songs chart. Her debut studio album, Perfectly Imperfect, was released on August 7, 2012. Her second album, Ellevation, was released on July 12, 2019.

Albums

Studio albums

Mixtapes

Singles

As lead artist

Promotional singles

Guest appearances

Songwriting credits

References

External links 
 Elle Varner Discography 

Discographies of American artists
Rhythm and blues discographies